Cochrane v. Deener, 94 U.S. 780 (1876), was a United States Supreme Court case in which the Court held that a process transforming grain meal into purified flour was patentable.

References

External links 
 

United States patent case law
United States Supreme Court cases
United States Supreme Court cases of the Waite Court
1876 in United States case law